Nucleosome-remodeling factor subunit BPTF is a protein that in humans is encoded by the BPTF gene.

This gene was identified by the reactivity of its encoded protein to a monoclonal antibody prepared against brain homogenates from patients with Alzheimer's disease. Analysis of the original protein (fetal Alz-50 reactive clone 1, or FAC1), identified as an 810 aa protein containing a DNA-binding domain and a zinc finger motif, suggested it might play a role in the regulation of transcription. High levels of FAC1 were detected in fetal brain and in patients with neurodegenerative diseases. The protein encoded by this gene is actually much larger than originally thought, and it also contains a C-terminal bromodomain characteristic of proteins that regulate transcription during proliferation. The encoded protein is highly similar to the largest subunit of the Drosophila NURF (nucleosome remodeling factor) complex. In Drosophila, the NURF complex, which catalyzes nucleosome sliding on DNA and interacts with sequence-specific transcription factors, is necessary for the chromatin remodeling required for transcription. Two alternative transcripts encoding different isoforms have been described completely.

Interactions
BPTF has been shown to interact with MAZ.

References

External links

Further reading